Ghorpade is a surname found among Marathi Brahmins and Marathas in the Indian states of Maharashtra and Karnataka.

Notable people 
 Santaji Ghorpade (1645–1696),  Maratha warrior, chief general of Rajaram Maharaj
 Yeshwantrao Ghorpade (1908–1996), last raja of Sandur 
 M. Y. Ghorpade (1931–2011), politician from Karnataka
 Jayasinghrao Ghorpade, Indian cricketer 
 Sujay Ghorpade (born 1965), Indian table tennis player
 K. V. Ghorpade (1919–1997), Indian pathologist

References

Sources

Marathi

Maratha clans
Marathi-language surnames
Surnames